Bruce Wilder Saville  (March 16, 1893 – February 27, 1939)  was an American sculptor born in Quincy, Massachusetts, and known for his monuments.

Early years

He began his art studies at the Boston Art Normal School,   where he studied with Cyrus Dallin.  He later worked in the studio of  Theo Alice Ruggles Kitson and Henry Hudson Kitson.

During World War I Saville joined the French Ambulance Corps for a year and then transferred to the U.S. Army Corps of Engineers for the remainder of the war.  Following the end of the war he remained in Europe where he, "studied under European masters."

Later career
After working there for four years in the Kitson's studio Saville moved to Columbus, Ohio, where he taught sculpture at Ohio State University, and at the Columbus Art School during the 1920s.

By 1930 he moved to Santa Fe, New Mexico, where he resided and worked until his death there in 1939.  Many of his works can be found in the New Mexico Museum of Art.

He is the author of several World War I memorials as well as two Civil War memorials to  Jonathan Richmond and Stephen G. Hicks, both located at Vicksburg National Military Park in Vicksburg, Mississippi.

Saville was a member of the National Sculpture Society.

Selected works
 Peace, Ohio Statehouse, 1922
 Until the Dawn, White Chapel Memorial Cemetery, Troy, Michigan 1928
 Battle of Fallen Timbers Monument, Maumee, Ohio, 1929 
Doughboy Memorial, Quincy, Massachusetts
Victorious Soldier, Sullivant Hall, Ohio State University, Columbus, Ohio
Victory and Peace Monument, Glens Falls, New York 1927 
Lebanon War Memorial, Lebanon, Connecticut, 1922
The Canadian Doughboy, Saint John, Halifax, Nova Scotia, Canada, 1921
The Three Wars, Palmyra, Maine

References

1893 births
1938 deaths
People from Quincy, Massachusetts
Sculptors from Massachusetts
United States Army personnel of World War I
American architectural sculptors
American male sculptors
Ohio State University faculty
20th-century American sculptors
20th-century American male artists
National Sculpture Society members